Rugby union in Uzbekistan is a minor but growing sport.

History

Soviet period
Rugby union was played in the Russian Empire as early as in 1908. In 1934 the Moscow Championship was started, and in 1936 the first Soviet Championship took place.

In 1949, rugby union was forbidden in the USSR during the "fight against the cosmopolitanism". The competitions were resumed in 1957, and the Soviet Championship in 1966. In 1975 the Soviet national team played their first match.

In 1962, rugby in Uzbekistan underwent a major expansion as four new teams were founded.

Uzbekistan had its own rugby team in the USSR, but it was not treated as a proper national side.

Post-independence
Uzbek rugby, like that of Kyrgyzstan is mainly  confined to the military and universities, although there is a schools programme underway. Kazakhstan has been a major impetus for rugby growth in the region (Almaty had a team in the Soviet league, and they also have a formidable women's team), and has been a major factor in keeping the game going in its neighbouring countries. For years, most of Uzbekistan's games, formal, or informal were against , or Kazakh domestic sides.

Currently they take part in the Central Asian region of the Asian Five Nations.

See also
 Uzbekistan national rugby union team

Bibliography
 Louis, Victor & Jennifer Sport in the Soviet Union (Oxford Pergamon, 1980)

References

External links
 IRB Uzbekistan page 
 Rugby in Asia, Uzbekistan page 
 Asian Rugby Football Union
 "Islam and Rugby" on the Rugby Readers review

 
Sport in Uzbekistan